Sorkhab may refer to:
 Sorkhab, Alborz, Iran
 Sorkhab, Ardabil, Iran
 Sorkhab, Hamadan, Iran
 Sorkhab, West Azerbaijan

See also
 Surkhab (disambiguation)